Areias is a surname. Notable people with the surname include:

 Juliana Areias (born 1975), Brazilian singer-songwriter, also known as The Bossa Nova Baby
 Miguel Areias (born 1977), Portuguese footballer
 Renan Areias (born 1998), Brazilian footballer
 Rui Areias (born 1993), Portuguese footballer
 Rusty Areias (born 1949), American politician

See also 

 Areias (disambiguation)